Cylindera chiliensis is a species of ground beetle of the subfamily Cicindelinae. It is found in Argentina and Chile.

References

chiliensis
Beetles described in 1839
Beetles of South America
Taxa named by Gaspard Auguste Brullé